The Xueshan Range is a mountain range in northern Taiwan. It faces the Chungyang Range on the southeast. Shei-Pa National Park is located around the peaks of Xueshan and Dabajianshan.

Names
The current name derives from the pinyin romanization of the Chinese name of the range's highest peak, Xueshan. Under the Qing, the range was also known variously as the Middle, Western, Dodds, or

List of peaks
There are 54 peaks taller than  among the Xueshan Range, 19 of which are numbered among the 100 Peaks of Taiwan:

Xueshan Main Peak (雪山主峰), 
Xueshan Eastern Peak (雪山東峰), 
Xueshan Northern Peak (雪山北峰), 
Daxueshan (大雪山), 
Zhongxueshan (中雪山), 
Huoshishan (火石山), 
Touyingshan (頭鷹山), 
Zhijiayangdashan (志佳陽大山), 
Dabajianshan (大霸尖山), 
Xiaobajianshan (小霸尖山), 
Baigudashan (白姑大山), 
Yizeshan (伊澤山), 
Dajianshan (大劍山), 
Jianshan (劍山]), 
Jiayangshan (佳陽山), 
Pintianshan (品田山), 
Chiyoushan (池有山), 
Taoshan (桃山), 
Kalayeshan (喀拉業山),

See also
 Hsuehshan Tunnel

References

Citations

Bibliography

 .
 

Mountain ranges of Taiwan
Landforms of Taichung
Landforms of Miaoli County
Landforms of Hsinchu County